
Opatów County is a unit of territorial administration and local government (powiat) in Świętokrzyskie Voivodeship, south-central Poland. It came into being on January 1, 1999, as a result of the Polish local government reforms passed in 1998.

As of 2019 its total population is 53,942, out of which the population of Opatów is 6,466, that of Ożarów is 4,569, and the rural population is 42,907.

Neighbouring counties
Opatów County is bordered by Ostrowiec County and Lipsko County to the north, Opole Lubelskie County to the north-east, Kraśnik County and Sandomierz County to the east, Staszów County to the south-west, and Kielce County to the west.

Administrative division
The county is subdivided into eight gminas (two urban-rural and six rural). These are listed in the following table, in descending order of population.

References

 
Land counties of Świętokrzyskie Voivodeship